The 2D Z-transform, similar to the Z-transform, is used in Multidimensional signal processing to relate a two-dimensional discrete-time signal to the complex frequency domain in which the 2D surface in 4D space that the Fourier Transform lies on is known as the unit surface or unit bicircle. The 2D Z-transform is defined by

The 2D Z-transform is a generalized version of the 2D Fourier transform. It converges for a much wider class of sequences, and is a helpful tool in allowing one to draw conclusions on system characteristics such as BIBO stability. It is also used to determine the connection between the input and output of a linear Shift-invariant system, such as manipulating a difference equation to determine the system's Transfer function.

Region of Convergence (ROC)
The Region of Convergence is the set of points in complex space where:

In the 1D case this is represented by an annulus, and the 2D representation of an annulus is known as the Reinhardt domain. From this one can conclude that only the magnitude and not the phase of a point at  will determine whether or not it lies within the ROC. In order for a 2D Z-transform to fully define the system in which it means to describe, the associated ROC must also be know. Conclusions can be drawn on the Region of Convergence based on Region of Support (mathematics) of the original sequence .

Finite Support Sequences
A sequence with a region of support that is bonded by an area  within the  plane can be represented in the z-domain as:

First Quadrant and Wedge Sequences
Sequences with a region of support in the first quadrant of the  plane have the following 2D Z-transform:

From the transform if a point  lies within the ROC then any point with a magnitude

also lie within the ROC. Due to these condition, the boundary of the ROC must have a negative slope or a slope of 0. This can be assumed because if the slope was positive there would be points that meet the previous condition, but also lie outside the ROC. For example, the sequence:

 has the  transform

It is obvious that this only converges for

So the boundary of the ROC is simply a line with a slope of -1 in the  plane.

In the case of a wedge sequence where the region of support is less than that of a half plane. Suppose such a sequence has a region of support over the first quadrant and the region in the second quadrant where . If  is defined as  the new 2D Z-Transform becomes:

This converges if:

These conditions can then be used to determine constraints on the slope of the boundary of the ROC in a similar manner to that of a first quadrant sequence. By doing this one gets:

 and

Sequences with Region of Support in all Quadrants
A sequence with an unbounded Region of Support can have an ROC in any shape, and must be determined based on the sequence . A few examples are listed below:

will converge for all . While:

However, These are the extreme cases, and usually, the Z-transform will converge over a finite area.

A sequence with support over the entire  can be written as a sum of each quadrant sequence:

Now Suppose:

and  also have similar definitions over their respective quadrants. Then the Region of convergence is simply the intersection between the four 2D Z-transforms in each quadrant.

Using the 2D Z-transform to solve difference equations
A 2D difference equation relates the input to the output of a Linear Shift-Invariant (LSI) System in the following manner:

Due to the finite limits of computation, it can be assumed that both a and b are sequences of finite extent. After using the z transform, the equation becomes:

This gives:

Thus we have defined the relation between the input and output of the LSI system.

Using the 2D Z-Transform to Determine Stability

Shanks' Theorem I
The filter is stable iff:

Shanks Theorem II
The filter is stable iff:

Huang's Theorem
The filter is stable iff:

 for any  such that

Decarlo and Strintzis' Theorem
The filter is stable iff:

 for any  such that 

 for any  such that

Solving 2D Z-Transforms

Approach 1: Finite Sequences
For finite sequences, the 2D Z-transform is simply the sum of magnitude of each point multiplied by  raised to the inverse power of the location of the corresponding point. For example, the sequence:

has the Z-transform:

As this is a finite sequence the ROC is for all .

Approach 2: Sequences with values along only  or 
For example, the sequence:

Therefore, its Z-transform is given by:

As this is a finite sequence the ROC is for all .

Approach 3: Separable Sequences
A separable sequence is defined as 

For example, the sequence:

Therefore, its Z-transform is given by

The ROC is given by:

 ;

References

Digital signal processing
Multidimensional signal processing